Snow Mountain garlic (also known as Allium sativum L., Allium schoenoprasum, and Kashmiri garlic), is a subspecies of garlic which is found in the mountainous in Jammu and Kashmir. In Hindi, it is known as ek pothi lahsun.

References

Allium
Garlic
Herbs